Bernson is a surname. Notable people with the surname include:

Jon Bernson, American singer and songwriter
Hal Bernson (1930–2020), American clothier
Reysa Bernson (1904–1944), French astronomer
Sigrid Bernson (born 1988), Swedish singer and dancer
Stanley Bernson (born 1936), American murderer

See also
Benson (surname)